Joachim Kuhs (born June 25, 1956 in Schonach) is a German politician who is serving as an Alternative for Germany Member of the European Parliament.

Kuhs worked as a magistrate and for the State Audit Office in Freiburg. He first joined AfD in 2013, being an early member of the party. Within the AfD, he is a member of the Christians in the AfD (ChrAfD) group.

In May 2019, he was elected to the European Parliament for the AfD. In the German local elections taking place at the same time, he was elected to the municipal council of Baden-Baden. In the European Parliament, he sits with the Identity and Democracy group.

In 2020, German journalist Michael Kraske claimed that Kuhs had stated with the "old parties" in Germany would "force the Africanization of our culture."

References

Living people
MEPs for Germany 2019–2024
Alternative for Germany MEPs
1956 births